Partners in Kryme (or Partnerz in Kryme) was an American hip hop duo from New York City. Its members were James Alpern and Richard Usher, using the stage names of DJ Keymaster Snow and MC Golden Voice, respectively. They are most famously known for their debut single, "Turtle Power!", which was written for and featured in the movie Teenage Mutant Ninja Turtles in 1990, and became an international hit, reaching number 13 in the US and number one for four weeks in the UK. A second single, "Undercover", was released on Capitol Records, but the group never released a full-length album. Another song, "Love 2 Love U" was recorded in 1991 for the soundtrack of Cool as Ice movie.

According to the UK magazine Smash Hits, the word Kryme is in fact an acronym for K.eep R.hythm Y.our M.otivating E.lement;

On May 30, 2015, Partners In Kryme released a new single centered on the Teenage Mutant Ninja Turtles on their official YouTube channel, entitled "Rock The Halfshell."

Discography

Singles

References

American hip hop groups
American musical duos
Hip hop duos
Musical groups established in 1990
Musical groups from New York City